Al-Bayuk (also spelled al-Buyuk) is a Palestinian village in the Rafah Governorate located south of Rafah in the southern Gaza Strip. According to the Palestinian Central Bureau of Statistics (PCBS), it had a population of 5,648 in 2006.

References

Villages in the Gaza Strip
Municipalities of the State of Palestine